Raffaele Sergio (born 27 August 1966) is a retired Italian football defender.

References

1966 births
Living people
Italian footballers
Cavese 1919 players
Benevento Calcio players
Mantova 1911 players
S.S. Lazio players
Torino F.C. players
A.C. Ancona players
Udinese Calcio players
S.S.C. Napoli players
Association football defenders
Serie A players
Serie C players